Zone 90 is a zone of the municipality of Al Wakrah in the state of Qatar. The main district recorded in the 2015 population census was the municipal seat, Al Wakrah City.

Other districts which fall within its administrative boundaries are the Al Wakrah Industrial Area and Umm Al Houl.

Demographics

Land use
The Ministry of Municipality and Environment (MME) breaks down land use in the zone as follows.

References 

Zones of Qatar
Al Wakrah